Candan Tarhan (26 June 1942 – 18 April 1989) was a Turkish football manager. He managed the Turkish national team.

References

1942 births
1989 deaths
Turkish football managers
Altay S.K. managers
Karşıyaka S.K. managers
Turkey national football team managers
Sarıyer S.K. managers
Bakırköyspor managers